Jok or JOK may refer to:

People 
 Jeremiah Owusu-Koramoah (born 1999), American football linebacker 
 Jok Church (1949–2016), American cartoonist
 Johnny O'Keefe (1935–1978), Australian singer
 John Luk Jok (1951-2020), South Sudanese politician
 Stan Jok (1926–1972), American professional baseball player

Other uses 
 Jok (spirit), A class of entities within the traditional Acholi belief system
 Jok, Thai version of the Chinese rice soup Congee
 Yoshkar-Ola Airport, in Mari El Republic, Russia

See also 
 Just One Kiss (disambiguation)